Paulo Sérgio Mota (born 13 July 1991), known as Paulinho, is a Portuguese professional footballer who plays as a right-back for C.S. Marítimo.

Club career
Born in Santa Marinha (Vila Nova de Gaia), Porto District, Paulinho began his football career with FC Porto, playing for the club from ages 10 to 18. In 2009 he joined another northern side, Leixões SC, where he spent his last year as a junior.

In his second season as a senior with the Matosinhos team, Paulinho appeared in 27 league games (all starts) to help them to a midtable finish in the second division. In the summer of 2012, he signed a three-year contract with newly promoted Moreirense F.C. for an undisclosed fee. He made his debut in the Primeira Liga on 26 November, playing the entire 2–2 home draw against Sporting CP.

With the exception of 2013–14, Paulinho continued to compete in the top flight the following years, representing in the process Moreirense, C.F. União, G.D. Chaves (two spells) and S.C. Braga. He scored his first goal as a professional on 21 August 2013, helping Moreirense to a 7–0 home rout of Chaves in the second tier.

Paulinho joined Greek club AEK Athens F.C. on 7 June 2019, on a two-year deal with an extension option for another year. He returned to Portugal on 30 January 2021, with Gil Vicente F.C. of the top division.

On 17 August 2021, Paulinho signed a one-year contract with Moreirense.

Career statistics

References

External links

1991 births
Living people
Sportspeople from Vila Nova de Gaia
Portuguese footballers
Association football defenders
Primeira Liga players
Liga Portugal 2 players
Leixões S.C. players
Moreirense F.C. players
C.F. União players
G.D. Chaves players
S.C. Braga players
Gil Vicente F.C. players
C.S. Marítimo players
Super League Greece players
AEK Athens F.C. players
Portugal youth international footballers
Portuguese expatriate footballers
Expatriate footballers in Greece
Portuguese expatriate sportspeople in Greece